Kevin Dornell Magee (January 24, 1959 – October 23, 2003), was an  American basketball player who played most of his professional career for Maccabi Tel Aviv. He played at the power forward and center positions. Magee played college basketball for the UCI Irvine Anteaters, earning All-American honors in both seasons. In 1993–94, he led the Israel Basketball Premier League in rebounds.

College career
Magee went to Southeastern Louisiana University and then the University of Houston, but he was not ready for school, dropping out both times without playing basketball. He went to Saddleback College in Mission Viejo, California, before transferring to the University of California, Irvine, where he played two years for the Anteaters in the Pacific Coast Athletic Association (PCAA, now Big West Conference). A two-time All-American in the early 1980s, Magee was also the PCAA Player of the Year in 1980–81 and 1981–82. In those two seasons, he averaged 26.3 points and 12.3 rebounds per game along with a field goal percentage of 66%. He was a first-team All-PCAA and first-team All-District 8 both seasons, was named District 8 Most Valuable Player in 1982, and was ranked in the nation's top 10 in scoring, rebounding, and field-goal percentage both seasons. He was named a first-team All-American by the Associated Press in 1981, when he became the first player in NCAA history to finish in the top four in three statistical categories, finishing third in the country in scoring (27.5), second in field goal percentage (67.1) and fourth in rebounding (12.5). His was the first to have their number retired in UCI history, and he was inducted into the UCI Hall of Fame in 1997.

Professional career
Magee was selected by the Phoenix Suns, in the 2nd round (39th overall) of the 1982 NBA Draft; however he never played in the NBA.

He played in Europe, for Spanish side CAI Zaragoza, with whom he won Spanish King's Cup in 1984, and with them, he was also a FIBA Korać Cup semifinalist.

Later, he played for Maccabi Tel Aviv, winning with them 6 Israeli League championships (1985–1990), and 5 Israeli State Cups (1985–1987, 1989, 1990). He was also a two-time EuroLeague semifinalist (1985, 1986), and a three-time Finalist (1987, 1988, 1989). At the peak of his career in Israel, he became a national sensation, being one of the first celebrities featured in advertisements. Most notable was his commercial for Telma peanut butter.

He rejoined CAI Zaragoza in 1991, and was a FIBA European Cup Winner's Cup Finalist, in the 1990-91 season.

While playing with Auxilium Torino of the Italian Lega Basket Serie A, he led the league in rebounding, in the 1991-92 season.

In 1993-94 he was the top rebounder in the Israel Basketball Premier League.

Awards and accomplishments
6× Israeli League Champion: 1985, 1986, 1987, 1988, 1989, 1990 (Maccabi Tel Aviv)
5× Israeli State Cup Winner: 1985, 1986, 1987, 1989, 1990 (Maccabi Tel Aviv) 
Spanish King's Cup Winner: 1984 (CAI Zaragoza)
3× EuroLeague Finalist: 1987, 1988, 1989 (Maccabi Tel Aviv)
2× EuroLeague Semifinalist: 1985, 1986 (Maccabi Tel Aviv)
FIBA European Cup Winner's Cup (FIBA Saporta Cup) Finalist: 1991 (CAI Zaragoza)
FIBA Korać Cup Semifinalist: 1984 (CAI Zaragoza)

Personal life
On October 23, 2003, Magee died at age 44 in a car accident on Interstate 55, south of Amite, Louisiana.

References

External links 
 Italian League Profile Retrieved 15 June 2015 
 
 1982 NBA Draft Review
 Spanish League Profile 

1959 births
2003 deaths
20th-century African-American sportspeople
21st-century African-American people
African-American basketball players
All-American college men's basketball players
American expatriate basketball people in France
American expatriate basketball people in Israel
American expatriate basketball people in Italy
American expatriate basketball people in Spain
American men's basketball players
Auxilium Pallacanestro Torino players
Basketball players from Gary, Indiana
Centers (basketball)
CB Zaragoza players
Israeli Basketball Premier League players
Lega Basket Serie A players
Liga ACB players
Maccabi Rishon LeZion basketball players
Maccabi Tel Aviv B.C. players
Pallacanestro Varese players
Paris Racing Basket players
Phoenix Suns draft picks
Power forwards (basketball)
Road incident deaths in Louisiana
Saddleback Gauchos men's basketball players
UC Irvine Anteaters men's basketball players